RR, Rr or rr may refer to:

Arts and entertainment
 RR (film), a 2008 experimental film by James Benning
 Randy Rhoads (1956–1982), American guitarist
 Jackson "Randy Rhoads", electric guitar design by Randy Rhoads, Grover Jackson, and Mike Shannon
 Rec Room (video game), a virtual reality massively multiplayer online game
 The Red Ribbon Army, a fictional army in the Dragon Ball series
 Ruff Ryders Entertainment, a record label and East Coast rap collective
 RR, the production code for the 1968 Doctor Who serial Fury from the Deep

Businesses and organizations
 Railroad Retirement, retirement benefits railroad workers
 Rashtriya Rifles, an Indian counter-insurgency force
 Rekords Rekords (logo), an American record label
 Rhodesia Regiment, Rhodesian Army unit
 Royal Air Force (IATA airline designator)
 Richard Rohac (logo), an Austrian art metal firm
 ITU Radio Regulations

Language
 rr (digraph)
 Revised Romanization of Korean, the official Korean language romanization system in South Korea
 Revised Romanization of Hangeul, the former official Hangeul language romanization system in South Korea

Science and technology

Biology and medicine
 RR, an Rh factor phenotype
 RR, abbreviation for blood pressure measurements taken with a sphygmomanometer invented by Scipione Riva-Rocci
 RR, abbreviation for the Relaxation Response, a natural autonomic response of the body induced by gently staying focused on a repetitive mental repetition of a word or phrase 
 RR interval (R wave to R wave interval), the inverse of heart rate
 Risk ratio, or relative risk, in statistics and epidemiology
 Respiratory rate, a vital sign

Other uses in science and technology
 Rapid Refresh, a short-range numerical weather prediction model
 Rear-engine, rear-wheel-drive layout, a term used in automotive technology
 Recoilless rifle
 Resource record, in the Domain Name System
 Round-robin scheduling, an algorithm for coordinating processes in an operating system
 Roundup Ready, for genetically modified crops resisting to glyphosate
 Route reflector, a Border Gateway Protocol configuration
 rr (debugging), a record and replay debugger for userspace Linux programs

Sports
 Rajasthan Royals, an Indian Premier League franchise
 Ranchi Rhinos, a defunct Hockey India League franchise
 Run rate, an average number of runs a batsman (or the batting side) scores in an over of 6 balls in cricket

Transportation
 Railroad
 Raritan River Railroad
 Regional Road, a class of road in Ontario
 Rhodesia Railways, former Zimbabwean railway company  
 Rhymney Railway, former British railway company
 Rolls-Royce Holdings (LSE code and logo)
 Rolls-Royce

 RR, a predecessor of the R (New York City Subway service)

Other uses
 Roraima (ISO 3166 code BR-RR), a state in Brazil

See also
 R&R (disambiguation)
 R (disambiguation)
 RRR (disambiguation)
 RRRR (disambiguation)